Del Campo's leaf-toed gecko (Phyllodactylus delcampoi), also known commonly as la salamanquesa de del Campo in Spanish, is a species of lizard in the family Phyllodactylidae. The species is endemic to Mexico.

Etymology
The specific name, delcampoi, is in honor of Mexican herpetologist Rafael Martín del Campo y Sánchez.

Geographic range
P. delcampoi is found in the Mexican state of Guerrero.

Habitat

Behavior
P. delcampoi is terrestrial and saxicolous.

Reproduction
P. delcampoi is oviparous.

References

Further reading
Mosauer W (1936). "Description of a New Phyllodactylus from Mexico, with Remarks on the Status of P. tuberculosus ". Copeia 1936 (3): 141–146. (Phyllodactylus delcampoi, new species).
Palacios-Aguilar R, Flores-Villela O (2018). "An updated checklist of the herpetofauna of from Guerrero, Mexico". Zootaxa 4422 (1): 1–24.
Rösler H (2000). "Kommentierte Liste der rezent, subrezent und fossil bekannten Geckotaxa (Reptilia: Gekkonomorpha)". Gekkota 2: 28–153. (Phyllodactylus delcampi, p. 104). (in German).
Smith HM, Taylor EH (1950). "An Annotated Checklist and Key to the Reptiles of Mexico Exclusive of the Snakes". Bulletin of the United States National Museum (199): 1–253. (Phyllodactylus delcampi, p. 47).

Phyllodactylus
Endemic reptiles of Mexico
Reptiles described in 1936